Two Men may refer to:

Two Men (1910 film), an American short film directed by Harry Solter
Two Men (1922 film), an American Western film directed by Robert North Bradbury
Two Men (1988 film), a Canadian television film directed by Gordon Pinsent
Two Men (1996 film), a South Korean film directed by Kwungwo Park starring Choi Jae-sung